Yair Wertheimer (also known as Meir Wertheimer; born 3 November 1955) is an Israeli former tennis player.

Tennis career
Beginning in 1972, Wertheimer played for the Israeli Davis Cup team and had a 6-4 record in singles and a 5-6 record in doubles.

In 1978, while ranked No. 1 in Israel, he went to the United States, on tennis scholarship from the University of California, Berkeley, where he studied Business Administration and played for the tennis team.

In 1997, he won the over-35 seniors tournament at Hapoel Tel Aviv.

References

External links
 
 
 

1955 births
Living people
Israeli male tennis players
California Golden Bears men's tennis players
Israeli expatriates in the United States
Asian Games medalists in tennis
Place of birth missing (living people)
Tennis players at the 1974 Asian Games
Asian Games gold medalists for Israel
Medalists at the 1974 Asian Games